Theresa Ferber Bernstein-Meyerowitz (March 1, 1890 – February 13, 2002) was an American artist and writer born in Kraków, in what is now Poland, and raised in Philadelphia. She received her art training in Philadelphia and New York City. Over the course of nearly a century, she produced hundreds of paintings and other artwork, plus several books and journals.

Bernstein and her husband William Meyerowitz, who was also an artist, lived and worked in Manhattan and Gloucester, Massachusetts. She painted portraits and scenes of daily life, plus reflections of the major issues of her time, in a modern style that evolved from realism to expressionism. She was active in several art associations and promoted her husband's work as well as her own. Her artworks are found in dozens of museums and private collections in the United States and abroad. She remained active all her life and was honored with a solo exhibition of 110 art works to celebrate her 110th birthday.

Bernstein also authored several books, including a biography of her husband and a journal about their many trips to Israel.

She died in 2002, just a couple of weeks short of her 112th birthday.

Biography

Early life
Theresa Ferber Bernstein was born in Kraków, Poland, on March 1, 1890. She was the only child of Isidore Bernstein, a Jewish textile manufacturer, and his wife Anne (née Ferber) Bernstein, an accomplished pianist. The family emigrated to the United States when Theresa was one year old. She showed an early interest in art and began learning to draw and paint at a young age. As a young woman, she traveled several times with her mother to Europe, where she was impressed by artists of the new Expressionist movement like Wassily Kandinsky, Franz Marc, and Edvard Munch.

Education
Bernstein graduated from the William D. Kelley School in Philadelphia in June 1907, at the age of 17. The same year, she received a scholarship to the Philadelphia School of Design for Women, now Moore College of Art & Design, where she studied with Harriet Sartain, Elliott Daingerfield, Henry B. Snell, Daniel Garber and others. She graduated in 1911 with an award for general achievement (the college awarded her an honorary doctorate in 1992). In 1912, she settled in Manhattan and enrolled at the Art Students League, where she took life and portraiture classes with William Merritt Chase.

Marriage and family
She met her future husband William Meyerowitz, also an artist, in 1917, and they married in Philadelphia on February 7, 1919. Their only child, a girl named Isadora, died in infancy. They lived in New York City and began spending summers in Gloucester, Massachusetts in the 1920s. In 1923, the couple traveled abroad together.

In the beginning, Bernstein's sales and reviews were far better than her husband's, but over time, her reputation waned due to a decreased interest in realistic subjects, even though they presented themselves as a "painting couple." During the Great Depression, Bernstein and her husband continued to teach in their studios in Manhattan and Gloucester and sold graphics to supplement their income. They became involved in the Zionist movement, and after the establishment of the State of Israel, they visited the country 13 times over 30 years. Until her husband's death in 1981, Bernstein promoted his artwork while creating her own. She stated that she did not feel it necessary to compete with him, as she was not competitive by nature.

Bernstein and Meyerowitz were close to two of their nieces, Laura Nyro and Barbara Meyerowitz (aka Barbara DeAngelis), and supported their musical education. Following the death of her husband, Bernstein developed a close relationship with DeAngelis' youngest son, Keith Carlson, who documented their relationship for a website in the artist's name that was created by the City University of New York.

Death
Bernstein and her husband lived for many decades in a rent-controlled loft-style studio apartment at 54 West 74th Street on the Upper West Side of Manhattan, just one block from Central Park West. This studio was her home at the time of her death on February 13, 2002, at Mount Sinai Hospital, shortly before her 112th birthday.

Career

Artistic style and subject matter
In 1913, Bernstein attended the Armory Show, the first large exhibition of modern art in America. Bernstein admired the style of Robert Henri, founder of the Ashcan School of American realism, and his way of depicting the everyday drama of the city. She was also influenced by John Sloan, Stuart Davis and others of the movement. According to art historian Gail Levin, Bernstein was for a time more popular than well-known realist Edward Hopper, although Bernstein's style over time tended more toward expressionism. However, unlike abstract artists, Bernstein remained committed to figuration, choosing always to connect with real life and people.

In her paintings, Bernstein depicted the major issues of her time: the women's suffrage movement, World War I, jazz, the plight of immigrants, unemployment, and racial discrimination. She also painted portraits of her husband and other people, including Polish musician and politician Ignacy Jan Paderewski, jazz musician Charlie Parker, and entertainer Judy Garland. Her studio near Bryant Park and Times Square allowed her to paint a cross-section of New Yorkers, using large brushstrokes and bold colors to depict the vitality of her subjects. At Coney Island and later during her summers in Gloucester, she painted harbors, beaches, fish, and still lifes.

Early reviewers praised her "man's vision," while recent scholars have found that she had a "decidedly feminine sensibility." In the male-dominated art world of her time, Bernstein, like many women artists, was frequently overlooked. To try to avoid discrimination, she often signed her works using "T. Bernstein" or just her surname.

Associations
Bernstein was part of the Philadelphia Ten, an influential group of female artists. She was also a member of the National Association of Women Artists, the Society of American Graphic Artists and the North Shore Art Association. Her works were exhibited extensively with the National Academy of Design and the Society of Independent Artists, which she co-founded.

Selected exhibitions
1919: Bernstein's first solo exhibition at the Milch Gallery in New York City.
1930: The Baltimore Museum of Art held simultaneous solo exhibitions for Bernstein and her husband to help them build their individual careers.
1990: Echoes of New York: The Paintings of Theresa Bernstein, curated by art historian Michele Cohen, Museum of the City of New York.
1998: Theresa Bernstein: A Seventy-Year Retrospective, Joan Whalen Fine Art, New York City 
2000: Theresa Bernstein: An Early Modernist - Solo exhibition of 110 of Bernstein's art works held to celebrate her 110th birthday and attended by the artist, Jo-An Fine Art in New York City.
2014: Theresa Bernstein: A Century in Art: Retrospective exhibition of 44 of her works from public and private collections, organized by art historian Gail Levin, Franklin & Marshall College in Lancaster, Pennsylvania.

In all, Bernstein had more than 40 solo exhibitions over her lifetime.

Legacy

Visual arts

Among Bernstein's hundreds of works are the following of particular interest:
Gypsy (1909), one of her earliest paintings, which was in the New York Realist style.
The Readers (1914), based on her many hours spent at the New York Public Library, reading and sketching the people around her.
Self-Portrait (1914), showing the influence of Fauvism yet still in the American realist tradition
Girlhood (1921), a portrait typical of her 1920s work. The painting was purchased for the Phillips Collection, formerly called the Phillips Memorial Gallery, by Duncan Phillips, her first museum patron, in 1923. 
The First Orchestra in America, an oil mural on canvas in the Manheim, Pennsylvania post office, commissioned by the Treasury Section of Fine Arts, and completed in 1938.

An extensive gallery of Bernstein's paintings is available on the City University of New York website devoted to her life and work. See External links below.

Collections
Bernstein's artwork is held by a number of museums and other permanent collections, including:
The Phillips Collection
The Jewish Museum
The National Gallery of Art. 
The Smithsonian American Art Museum
The Harvard Art Museums
The Metropolitan Museum of Art
The New York Public Library
The Boca Raton Museum of Art in Florida.

Books
William Meyerowitz: The Artist Speaks, a biography of Bernstein's husband
The Poetic Canvas
The Journal
Israeli Journal, covering her many trips to Israel and reflections on her Jewish heritage (originally published in 1994)

Bibliography

References

External links
  includes detailed information about the artist (life, artwork, personal documents, video-taped interviews, remembrances, etc.)

1890 births
2002 deaths
20th-century American painters
American supercentenarians
Art Students League of New York alumni
Painters from New York City
Artists from Philadelphia
American women painters
Jewish American artists
Section of Painting and Sculpture artists
People from the Upper West Side
Polish emigrants to the United States
19th-century Polish Jews
20th-century American women artists
National Association of Women Artists members
Women supercentenarians
Philadelphia School of Design for Women alumni
20th-century American Jews
21st-century American Jews
21st-century American women